KLVF (100.7 FM, "The Best Music") is a radio station broadcasting an adult contemporary music format. Licensed to Las Vegas, New Mexico, United States, the station is currently owned by Baca Broadcasting, LLC and features programming from AP Radio.

History
The station was assigned the call sign KFUN-FM on May 30, 1980. On September 22, 1980, it changed its call sign to the current KLVF.

On October 18, 2002, then-owner KFUN-KLVF Inc. assigned the station's license, along with that of KFUN, to Meadows Media, LLC. Meadows Media assigned the license to the current owner, Baca Broadcasting, on September 23, 2008 at a purchase price of $600,000.

References

External links

LVF
Mainstream adult contemporary radio stations in the United States